Sugar is the third full-length album by Aloha. It was released in 2002 on Polyvinyl Records.

Track listing
"Fractures, Pt. 1" – 2:27
"They See Rocks" – 4:20
"Let Your Head Hang Low" – 4:44
"Balling Phase" – 6:26
"It Won't Be Long" – 3:04
"Protest Song" – 3:22
"Thieves All Around Us" – 5:01
"Dissolving" – 5:06
"I Wish No Chains Upon You" – 4:26
"We Get Down" – 6:05

Reception
New Music said of their album, "In the wake of That's Your Fire. Aloha's breathtaking and complex collection of jazz-based, vibraphone-enhanced lullabies, the band's sophomore release hits like a hurricane." They praised its "pretty melodies".

References

2002 albums
Aloha (band) albums